The Expedition of Bir Maona (also spelt Ma'una), according to Islamic tradition, took place four months after the Battle of Uhud in the year A.H. 4 of the Islamic calendar. 
It is believed the Islamic prophet Muhammad sent missionaries to preach Islam, at the request of Abu Bara. Forty (as per Ibn Ishaq) or seventy (as per Sahih Bukhari) of the Muslim missionaries sent by Muhammed were killed.

Background
Four months after the Uhud battle, a delegation of Banu Amir came to Muhammad and presented him with a gift. Abu Bara stayed in Medina. Muhammad declined to accept that gift because it was from a polytheist and asked Abu Bara to embrace Islam. He requested Muhammad to send some Muslims to the people of Najd to call them to Islam. At first, Muhammad was quite apprehensive of this, as he feared that some harm might befall these Muslim missionaries. On Muhammad’s hesitation, Abu Bara guaranteed the safety of the emissaries of Muhammad.

The Muslim scholar Tabari describes the event as follows:

Ibn Ishaq's Biography claims that forty men were sent to them; but Sahih al-Bukhari states that there were 70— Al-Mundhir bin ‘Amr, one of Banu Sa‘ida, nicknamed ‘Freed to die’ — commanded that group, who were the best and most learned in the Qur'an and jurisprudence.

A short time after the Raj’i incident (4 Safar/April 625), chief of the Amir ibn Sa'sa' tribe Abu Bara' Amir ibn Malik came to Madina and obtained information about Islam from Muhammad. Despite not being Muslim himself, he requested that Muhammad send representatives to his tribe to teach them about Islam. After receiving assurances of their safety, Muhammad assigned a group of seventy (or forty) people well-versed in the Qur’an, most of them natives of Madina and people of the Suffa, led by Mundhir ibn 'Amr al-Khazraji. When the group arrived at Bi'r Al-Mauna, on the road between Makka and Madina, Muhammad's companion Haram ibn Milhan was given the responsibility of taking Muhammad's letter to the chief of the Amir ibn Sa'sa' tribe. Meanwhile, upon receiving news that Amir ibn Malik had died, Haram ibn Milhan gave the letter to the former’s nephew Amir ibn Tufayl and invited those around him to Islam. Just as longtime, avowed enemy of Muhammad and the Muslims, Amir ibn Tufayl, had the envoy killed, he incited members of the tribe to launch an attack on the Muslims at Bi'r Al-Mauna. However, the people did not respond positively to this proposal due to the fact that Amir ibn Malik had guaranteed the safety of members of the delegation. Amir ibn Tufayl then appealed to certain branches of the Banu Sulaym tribe with whom they had bonds of friendship. With his provocation, armed groups from the neighboring tribes attacked the Muslims waiting at Bi'r Al-Mauna and completely unaware of any of these developments. They killed everyone except Ka’b ibn Zayd al-Najjar, who was severely wounded and left for dead, and Mundhir ibn Muhammad (or Harith ibn Thimma), who had taken the camels out for pasture at the time, and ‘Amr ibn Umayya. Unable to bear what had happened to his friends, Mundhir ibn Muhammad attacked the polytheists and was also killed. When ‘Amr ibn Umayya, who was taken as prisoner, said that he was from the tribe of Mudhar, he was released by Amir ibn Tufayl to fulfil his mother’s votive offering of emancipating a slave.

Learning of this horrific incident by means of revelation and informing his companions therein, Muhammad felt more pain and sorrow than ever before and cursed those responsible for this incident during every morning prayer for thirty or forty days on end. He sent a force of 24 men under the command of Shuja’ ibn Wahb, with the purpose of punishing the Amir ibn Sa'sa' tribe who were responsible for the Bi'r Al-Mauna massacre (8 Rabi` al-Awwal/May 629). Many animals were taken as booty and women captured in a sudden night raid. Some time later, a Muslim delegation from the Banu Amir ibn Sa'sa' came to Muhammad and requested that the women taken captive be released. Consulting with Shuja’ ibn Wahb and his companions, Muhammad released the women upon their acceptance of Islam.

Motives for attacking Muslims
William Montgomery Watt wrote that the motive of the Banu Lahyan for attacking Muslims, was that the Banu Lahyan wanted to get revenge for the assassination of their chief at Muhammad's instigation.

The background for the Abdullah Ibn Unais expedition revealed that Sufyan (tribal chief) was on his way to kill Muslims. Abdullah ibn Unais, upon enquiry to this intelligence encountered Sufyan to which he informed him he was. The Muslim migration to Madinah to reach safety from persecution in Makkah, clearly was being followed with tribes being sent to disrupt the Madinan community even after they had emigrated and were forced from their homes in Makkah. The intention of all these expeditions was to stop Muslim trade, Muslims' relations with other tribes and attempts at settling down into a community.

Islamic sources

Biographical literature
This event is mentioned in Ibn Hisham's biography of Muhammad. The Muslim jurist Ibn Qayyim Al-Jawziyya also mentions the event in his biography of Muhammad, Zad al-Ma'ad. Modern secondary sources which mention this, include the award-winning book, Ar-Raheeq Al-Makhtum (The Sealed Nectar). The event is also mentioned by the Muslim jurist Ibn Qayyim Al-Jawziyya in his biography of Muhammad, Zad al-Ma'ad.

Hadith literature
The event is mentioned in the Sunni hadith collection Sahih Bukhari, as follows:

The event is also mentioned in the Sahih Muslim hadith collection as follows:

Quran
According to Mubarakpuri, Quran 3:169-173 is related to the event, and the verse was later abrogated.

See also
Military career of Muhammad
List of expeditions of Muhammad
Muslim–Quraysh War

References

Notes

. Note: This is the free version available on Google Books.

625
Campaigns ordered by Muhammad